Exeter Rowing Club is a rowing club on the River Exe, based at Exe Water Sports Association, 62 Haven Road, Exeter, Devon.

History
The club was formed in 1864 but has much earlier origins with its early connections to the Exeter Amateur Rowing Club, St Thomas Amateur Rowing Club and Port Royal Amateur Rowing Club. It caters for all age groups and has had major national success in recent years.

Honours

National champions

References

Sport in Devon
Sport in Exeter
Rowing clubs in England
Exeter